Pibsé is a town in the Doulougou Department of Bazèga Province in central Burkina Faso. In 2005, the town had an estimated population of 1,050.

References

External links
Satellite map at Maplandia.com

Populated places in the Centre-Sud Region
Bazèga Province